Wabasso is an unincorporated community and census-designated place (CDP) in Indian River County, Florida, United States. The population was 609 at the 2010 census, down from 918 at the 2000 census. It is located at the intersection of U.S. 1 and SR 510.

Wabasso is part of the Sebastian–Vero Beach Metropolitan Statistical Area.

History
A post office called Wabasso has been in operation since 1898. The name Wabasso is derived from Ossabaw, Georgia – with the spelling reversed.

Geography
Wabasso is located in northeastern Indian River County at  (27.746775, -80.435115). It is bordered to the north by Sebastian and to the south by Winter Beach. To the east, across the tidal Indian River, is Wabasso Beach. U.S. Route 1 leads south from Wabasso  to Vero Beach, the county seat, and north  to Melbourne.

Demographics

As of the census of 2000, there were 918 people, 403 households, and 214 families residing in the CDP. The racial makeup of the CDP was 2.90% White, 95.56% African American, 0.65% Native American, 1.42% Asian, 7.41% from other races, and 2.07% from two or more races. Hispanic or Latino of any race were 12.75% of the population.

There were 403 households, out of which 20.1% had children under the age of 18 living with them, 40.7% were married couples living together, 9.4% had a female householder with no husband present, and 46.7% were non-families. 36.7% of all households were made up of individuals, and 13.9% had someone living alone who was 65 years of age or older.  The average household size was 2.23 and the average family size was 2.87.

In the CDP, the population was spread out, with 19.7% under the age of 18, 5.0% from 18 to 24, 29.5% from 25 to 44, 27.7% from 45 to 64, and 18.1% who were 65 years of age or older.  The median age was 42 years. For every 100 females, there were 120.1 males.  For every 100 females age 18 and over, there were 126.8 males.

The median income for a household in the CDP was $25,938, and the median income for a family was $25,815. Males had a median income of $21,188 versus $25,417 for females. The per capita income for the CDP was $18,557.  About 17.2% of families and 25.9% of the population were below the poverty line, including 51.5% of those under age 18 and 15.6% of those age 65 or over.

Notable person
Poet, critic and essayist Laura Riding and her husband Schuyler B. Jackson lived in Wabasso from approximately 1941 until his death in 1968, and she remained a resident until her death on September 2, 1991.

See also
 List of geographic names derived from anagrams and ananyms

References

Census-designated places in Indian River County, Florida
Census-designated places in Florida
Unincorporated communities in Indian River County, Florida
Unincorporated communities in Florida
Populated places on the Intracoastal Waterway in Florida
Former municipalities in Florida